Cathepsin W is a protein that in humans is encoded by the CTSW gene.

The protein encoded by this gene, a member of the peptidase C1 family of cysteine cathepsins, is a cysteine protease cathepsin that may have a specific function in the mechanism or regulation of T-cell cytolytic activity. The encoded protein is found associated with the cell membrane inside the endoplasmic reticulum of natural killer and cytotoxic T-cells. Expression of this gene is up-regulated by interleukin-2.

References

Further reading

External links
 The MEROPS online database for peptidases and their inhibitors: C01.037

Proteases
EC 3.4.22
Cathepsins